Tom Burke CBE is Chairman and Founding Director of E3G, Third Generation Environmentalism (Environmental Think Tank), an Environmental Policy Adviser to Rio Tinto, and a university Visiting Professor.  He played a leading part in establishing the European Environment Bureau for nearly two decades and was the Secretary-General of the European and North American NGO preparations for the Rio Earth Summit.

Burke has been a professional environmentalist for 30 years and was formerly Executive Director of Friends of the Earth. He has written and broadcast extensively and coined the term ‘green growth’ in 1987. In 1993, Burke was appointed to United Nations Environment Programme's Global 500 Roll of Honour. In 1997, Burke was appointed CBE for services to the environment.

Career
Tom Burke is Chairman and Founding Director of E3G, Third Generation Environmentalism (Environmental Think Tank)
and an Environmental Policy Adviser to Rio Tinto and a Visiting Professor at Imperial and University Colleges, London. He is Chairman of the Editorial Board of ENDS Magazine. He writes a regular column in BusinessGreen magazine.

He has been an environmentalist since first joining a Friends of the Earth local group in 1971. He joined the FoE staff in 1973 as its local groups coordinator and became its Executive Director in 1975. He was the Director of the Green Alliance from 1982 until 1991 when he became Michael Heseltine’s Special Advisor. While at the Green Alliance he ran for Parliament twice for the SDP and the Liberal Democrats.

He played a leading part in establishing the European Environment Bureau for nearly two decades and was the Secretary-General of the European and North American NGO preparations for the Rio Earth Summit. As a Special Advisor to three Secretaries of State for the Environment he was intimately involved in a wide range of international negotiations as well as all aspects of domestic environment policy.

In 1997, Burke was appointed CBE for services to the environment. In 1993, Burke was appointed to United Nations Environment Programme's Global 500 Roll of Honour. Burke has been a professional environmentalist for 30 years and was formerly Executive Director of Friends of the Earth.

Having begun developing dialogues with business while at the Green Alliance, he went to work for Rio Tinto and BP on leaving government in 1997. At Rio Tinto he created the Global Mining Initiative which engaged the industry globally with sustainable development and drafted Rio Tinto’s first climate policy in 1998. He also joined the Council of English Nature, the government’s statutory advisor on biodiversity where he served two terms until 2003.

Burke has co-authored several books including The Green Capitalists (Gollancz, 1987), Green Pages (Routledge, 1988), and Ethics, Environment and the Company (IBE, 1990).

He has written and broadcast extensively and coined the term ‘green growth’ in 1987. He remains actively involved on a wide range of environmental issues, working with NGOs, government and business. He is particularly active on energy and climate issues and is a prominent critic of the government’s policy on nuclear power.

Burke has also campaigned against nuclear power.

He endorsed the parliamentary candidacy of the Green Party's Caroline Lucas at the 2015 general election.

References

Year of birth missing (living people)
British writers
British environmentalists
Green thinkers
Living people
British anti–nuclear power activists